Dominik Csontos (born 8 November 2002) is a Hungarian football defender who plays for Győr.

Club career

Ferencváros
On 16 June 2020, he became champion with Ferencváros by beating Budapest Honvéd FC at the Hidegkuti Nándor Stadion on the 30th match day of the 2019–20 Nemzeti Bajnokság I season.

Győr through Mezőkövesd
On 24 January 2023, Csontos joined Mezőkövesd. On the same day, his rights were transferred to Győr and Csontos signed a two-and-a-half-year contract with the club.

Career statistics

References

External links
 
 

2002 births
People from Székesfehérvár
Living people
Hungarian footballers
Hungary under-21 international footballers
Association football defenders
Ferencvárosi TC footballers
Soroksár SC players
Mezőkövesdi SE footballers
Győri ETO FC players
Nemzeti Bajnokság I players
Nemzeti Bajnokság II players